St. Molua's Church, Killaloe is a medieval church and National Monument in Killaloe, Ireland.

Location

St. Molua's Church was constructed on Friar's Island in the River Shannon, to the south of Killaloe town. In 1929–30 the Shannon hydroelectric scheme raised the water level and submerged Friar's Island, and the church was dismantled and brought north to be constructed on its present site in the grounds of Killaloe Cathedral.

History

A monastery was founded on Friar's Island by Mo Lua in the 6th century. The stone church was built c. 1000, in the era of Brian Boru. The stone roof is one of the first in Ireland; most contemporary stone buildings had wooden roofs.

Church

The church consists of nave and narrow chancel, built of limestone and mortar. The roof was built without a barrel vault and so collapsed in a storm.

References

Religion in County Clare
Archaeological sites in County Clare
National Monuments in County Clare
Former churches in the Republic of Ireland